The University of Ottawa Heart Institute (UOHI) (French: Institut de cardiologie de l'Université d'Ottawa (ICUO)) is Canada's largest cardiovascular health centre. It is located in Ottawa, Ontario, Canada. It began as a department in The Ottawa Hospital, and since has evolved into Canada's only complete cardiac centre, encompassing prevention, diagnosis, treatment, rehabilitation, research, and education.

UOHI cares for more than 100,000 cardiac patients each year, and patient satisfaction is among the highest in Ontario, averaging 98 percent. The Heart Institute is affiliated with the Ottawa Hospital and the University of Ottawa, specifically the Faculty of Medicine.

The institute also provides training to more than 100 physicians annually and runs an extensive cardiovascular research program, with 60 principal investigators and research funding of approximately $65 million a year.

History
UOHI was founded in 1976 by Dr. Wilbert Keon, with financial support from the Ontario Ministry of Education. Keon worked with numerous partners, including all of the hospitals in the region, the University of Ottawa, and the Ottawa Hospital Regional District Planning council, to ensure the vision of a world-renowned institute would unfold as planned. The first phase of the Heart Institute—the Cardiac Unit, as it was then known—officially opened on May 11, 1976.

UOHI is now the sole, independent provider of specialized cardiovascular care for the Champlain Local Health Integration Network, home to over 1 million people (9 percent of the population of Ontario), and serves more than 40 referral hospitals throughout the province.

In 2004, UOHI recruited Dr. Robert Roberts from Baylor College of Medicine to serve as President and Chief Executive Officer. Roberts, an internationally recognized investigator in the field of molecular genetics, was brought in to place a greater emphasis on research within the institute. Shortly afterwards, UOHI established the Ruddy Canadian Cardiovascular Genetics Centre, the first such centre in Canada and one of only a handful worldwide dedicated to cardiovascular genetics.

In April 2014, former Heart Institute Chief of Cardiac Surgery Dr. Thierry Mesana took over as the third President and CEO of UOHI.

The institute has been responsible for numerous ‘firsts’, including:
 First use of point of care genetic testing in clinical medicine as part of the RAPID GENE study.
 Ontario's first angioplasty
 The first use in Canada, and 11th in the world, of the Jarvik 7 artificial heart as a bridge to transplant
 A heart transplant on the youngest recipient in Canada (an 11-day-old infant)
 Canada's first cardiac positron emission tomography (PET) centre
 Discovery of a genetic mutation that causes one of the most common forms of heart disease—atrial fibrillation
 Identification of the first single-nucleotide polymorphism that increases susceptibility to heart disease regardless of other established risk factors
 A one-of-a-kind Canadian home tele-health monitoring program that cuts hospital readmission by 54 percent for heart failure patients
 A first multi-faceted Women's Heart Health Centre that will focus its programs on prevention and management services for women at risk of and diagnosed with cardiovascular disease.

Clinical specialties
UOHI maintains a clinical staff of over 700, including physicians, nurses, technicians, and other health professionals. In addition to standard care, approximately 100 clinical trials are underway at the institute at any time.

Cardiac anesthesiology
More than 1,900 open-heart procedures at UOHI each year require anesthesia, including coronary artery bypass, valve replacement, heart transplant, pulmonary thromboendarterectomy, mechanical circulatory assist devices and others. Clinical anesthesia is also provided for a growing number and variety of pacemaker and implantable cardioverter-defibrillator, percutaneous aortic valve, and arrhythmia procedures.

Cardiac imaging
UOHI is a national centre for cardiac imaging. The institute employs all standard imaging modalities and evaluates experimental techniques and applications. UOHI also has the rare capability to develop and produce novel, short-lived nuclear tracers on site. The on-site cyclotron lets the institute produce many of its own medical isotopes, particularly for PET imaging. UOHI’s Nuclear Cardiology Program is the largest such clinical program in Canada.

Cardiac surgery
UOHI's cardiac surgeons perform more than 1,900 open-heart procedures annually, and the institute is known for its reconstructive heart-valve surgery program. Dr. Marc Ruel is the Chief of Cardiac Surgery. It has among the lowest mortality rates and largest patient volumes in North America, especially for high-risk patients. Surgical specialties include:
 Heart valve repair
 Percutaneous aortic valve replacement
 Multi-vessel small thoracotomy
 Heart transplantation
 Mechanical assist devices
 Thoracoscopic surgical ablation
 Pulmonary thromboendarterectomy

The Heart Institute is the provincial centre for pulmonary thromboendarterectomy.

Cardiac Prevention and Rehabilitation
The Cardiac Prevention and Rehabilitation program focuses its efforts in five areas: cardiac rehabilitation, the Prevention & Wellness Centre (for patient and public education), the Champlain Cardiovascular Disease Prevention Network, the Ottawa Model for Smoking Cessation (implemented in more than 200 medical institutions across Canada), and behavioral and risk modification research.

Cardiology
Approximately 50,000 patients a year visit UOHI’s cardiology clinics for testing and treatment of heart disorders. The Cardiology program operates a number of specialized clinics that address various conditions and risk factors for heart disease.

The institute's cardiologists conduct more than 12,000 non-surgical interventions annually.

The ST-Elevation Myocardial Infarction (STEMI) Protocol, developed at UOHI, specifies that paramedic in Ottawa identify patients with a STEMI heart attack and transport them directly to the Institute. The program has cut mortality rates from heart attack in Ottawa by half.

Clinical services
UOHI’s division of nursing manages or supports programs and units within the Heart Institute, including the cardiac catheterization and electrophysiology labs, the cardiac operating rooms, the cardiac surgery intensive care unit and the cardiac intensive care unit.

UOHI offers specialized cardiac nursing training and education in a number of areas, such as critical care, provincial programs in cardiac CT, cardiac PET, artificial hearts, and pulmonary thromboendarterectomy.

Research
Since 2004, a concerted effort to grow research funding at UOHI has resulted in a 300 percent increase in total grant awards. The Institute has more than 60 principal investigators and 175 research staff members whose work encompasses all aspects of cardiovascular medicine. Research programs include:
 Atherosclerosis, Genetics & Cell Biology
 Biomaterials and Regeneration
 Biomedical Engineering
 Cardiac Anesthesiology
 Cardiac Imaging
 Cardiac Prevention & Rehabilitation Research
 Cardiac Surgery Research
 Cardiology Research
 Cardiovascular Devices
 Cardiovascular Endocrinology
 Cardiovascular Genetics
 Cardiovascular Research Methods Centre
 Clinical Services Research
 Clinical Trials
 Hypertension

Major findings
Heart Institute investigators:
 Identified the strongest genetic risk factor for coronary artery disease and heart attack to date (the 9p21 gene)—the first major risk factor discovered since cholesterol
 Discovered the genetic basis for atrial fibrillation, the most common form of cardiac arrhythmia, affecting 250,000 Canadians
 Conducted the most comprehensive assessment of high blood pressure in Canada in 15 years
 Developed a model smoking cessation program that is in use in more than 200 hospitals across Canada and is being adopted internationally
 Unlocked the mechanism controlling a gene that regulates weight loss
 Developed a novel biomaterial that grows new blood vessels
 Developed Canada's first cardiac autopsy guidelines now in use in Ontario
 Developed an integrated regional protocol that cuts heart attack deaths by half

Education and training
UOHI trains physicians, nurses, technologists, technicians, and other health professionals, as well as graduate students and post-doctoral students in the life and biomedical sciences. The Heart Institute also provides continuing education and best practice training for health care professionals and institutions, and develops patient education tools and programs to facilitate and support self-management of cardiovascular risk factors.

The institute is certified by the Royal College of Physicians and Surgeons of Canada for residency and fellowship training in cardiac surgery, cardiology, and cardiac anesthesiology.

See also
 Toronto General Hospital

References

External links
 

Educational institutions established in 1976
Hospital buildings completed in 1976
Hospitals in Ottawa
Heart Institute
Research in Ottawa
Heart disease organizations
Hospitals established in 1976
1976 establishments in Ontario